Ludia is a genus of flowering plants in the family Salicaceae.

The genus is native to the Zanzibar–Inhambane coastal forests of Kenya and Tanzania, as well as to Madagascar, the Comoros, the Seychelles, and Aldabra.

Species
Species accepted by the Plants of the World Online as of October 2022:

Ludia ankaranensis  – Madagascar
Ludia antanosarum  – Madagascar
Ludia arborea  – Madagascar
Ludia boinensis  – Madagascar
Ludia brevipes  – Madagascar
Ludia chapelieri  – Madagascar
Ludia comorensis  – Comoros
Ludia craggiana  – Madagascar
Ludia dracaenoides  – Madagascar
Ludia erosifolia  – Madagascar
Ludia faradifani  – Madagascar
Ludia glaucocarpa  – Madagascar
Ludia ikongoensis  – Madagascar
Ludia imontiensis  – Madagascar
Ludia leandriana  – Madagascar
Ludia ludiifolia  – Madagascar
Ludia madagascariensis  – Madagascar
Ludia mauritiana  – Aldabra, Comoros, Kenya, Madagascar, Mauritius, Seychelles, Tanzania
Ludia myrtoides  – Madagascar
Ludia pachyadenia  – Madagascar
Ludia pinnatinervia  – Madagascar
Ludia scolopioides  – Madagascar
Ludia sessilis  – Madagascar
Ludia suarezensis  – Madagascar
Ludia wikstroemiifolia  – Madagascar

References

Salicaceae
Salicaceae genera